Miami is an unincorporated community in Kanawha County, West Virginia, United States. Miami has a post office with ZIP code 25134.

The community was named after the Miami Indians.

References

Unincorporated communities in Kanawha County, West Virginia
Unincorporated communities in West Virginia